Lester H. Cuneo (October 25, 1888 – November 1, 1925) was an American stage and silent film actor. He began acting in live theatre while still in his teens.

Early years
Born in Chicago, Illinois, Cuneo attended Culver Military Academy and was a law student at Northwestern University when he turned to acting.

Career

Cuneo's stage career included work with stock theater companies in Brooklyn, Chicago, and Winnepeg.

Cuneo began a film career in 1912 with the Chicago-based Selig Polyscope Company then joined Essanay Studios in 1914. Working in early Hollywood, his popularity increased after he switched from comedic roles to the increasingly popular western film genre. However, his career was temporarily interrupted when he served with the United States Army during World War I. He served in France in 1917-1919 with the 33rd Division from Illinois.

At war's end, Lester Cuneo returned to film and in the early 1920s set up his own production company making primarily western films.

Personal life

He married actress Francelia Billington in 1920 and had two children. The two made fourteen films together before their divorce in October 1925.

Death

Despondent over the breakdown of his marriage and the downhill slide of his film career, Lester Cuneo took his own life with a gunshot to the head in 1925. He was interred in the Forest Lawn Memorial Park Cemetery in Glendale, California. His year of death is printed on his gravemarker as 1926 which contradicts 1925, the year usually given.

Filmography

 Sons of the North Woods (1912)
 According to Law (1912)
 The Double Cross (1912)
 The Peculiar Nature of the White Man's Burden (1912)
 An Unexpected Fortune (1912)
 The Boob (1912)
 A Cowboy's Mother (1912)
 The Whiskey Runners (1912)
 An Equine Hero (1912) – Pete (half-breed)
 Circumstantial Evidence (1912) – Hort Ingles
 The Fighting Instinct (1912)
 The Brand Blotter (1912)
 The Cattle Rustlers (1912)
 Why Jim Reformed (1912)
 A Motorcycle Adventure (1912)
 The Opium Smugglers (1912)
 So-Jun-Wah and the Tribal Law (1912)
 Jim's Vindication (1912)
 The Dynamiters (1912) – Joe Thompson
 Between Love and the Law (1912)
 Roped In (1912) – The Cowboy
 The Ranger and His Horse (1912) – Pete Rogers
 Buck's Romance (1912) – Squaw's Father
 A Rough Rider With Nitroglycerine (1912)
 The Gunfighter's Son (1913)
 The Cowboy Editor (1913)
 Bud's Heiress (1913)
 A Canine Matchmaker; or, Leave It to a Dog (1913)
 How It Happened (1913)
 Bill's Birthday Present (1913)
 The Range Law (1913)
 The Bank's Messenger (1913)
 The Deputy's Sweetheart (1913)
 Juggling With Fate (1913) – Wallace
 The Sheriff of Yavapai County (1913) – The Frisco Kid (Apache Frank's partner)
 The Life Timer (1913) – Tom
 The Mail Order Suit (1913) – Steve
 His Father's Deputy (1913) – Sam Marvin (a crook)
 Religion and Gun Practice (1913) – Finely Overmeyer
 The Law and the Outlaw (1913) – Monty Ray
 An Embarrassed Bridegroom (1913)
 The Jealousy of Miguel and Isabella (1913)
 The Only Chance (1913) – Train Dispatcher
 Taming a Tenderfoot (1913) – Willie B. Clever (the tenderfoot)
 The Marshal's Capture (1913) – The marshal's wife's brother
 Sallie's Sure Shot (1913) – Coyote Jim
 Made A Coward (1913) – Tom Jones
 The Señorita's Repentance (1913)
 The Stolen Moccasins (1913) – Harden
 The Galloping Romeo (1913)
 How Betty Made Good (1913) – Jim
 The Rejected Lover's Luck (1913) Ben
 The Capture of Bad Brown (1913)
 The Cattle Thief's Escape (1913) – Charley Pointer
 The Silver Grindstone (1913) – Harry Custer
 Dishwash Dick's Counterfeit (1913) – Dick Mason
 Two Sacks of Potatoes (1913)
 The Schoolmarm's Shooting Match (1913) – Brown
 The Sheriff and the Rustler (1913) – The Sheriff
 The Child of the Prairies (1913) – Ed Dillon
 The Escape of Jim Dolan (1913) – Ed Jones
 Cupid in the Cow Camp (1913) – Arizona Bob
 The Rustler's Reformation (1913)
 Physical Culture on the Quarter Circle V Bar (1913) – Pete
 Buster's Little Game (1913) – Robins
 Mother Love Vs Gold (1913) – Jim Sykes
 By Unseen Hand (1914) – Warrington
 A Friend In Need (1914) – Girl's Father
 The Little Sister (1914) – First Badman
 A Mix-Up on the Plains (1914)
 A Romance of the Forest Reserve (1914)
 Marrying Gretchen (1914)
 Marian, the Holy Terror (1914)
 Algie's Sister (1914)
 Under Royal Patronage (1914) – Baron Spitzhausen
 The Plum Tree (1914) – Norris Griggs
 A Splendid Dishonor (1914) – Dr. Appledance
 The Moving Picture Cowboy (1914) – Director
 The Fable of the Author and the Dear Public and the Plate of Mush (1914)
 The Other Man (1914)
 In the Glare of the Lights (1914) – Joe Brandigan
 The Private Officer (1914) – Capt. Osborne
 His Dearest Foes (1914)
 The Prince Party (1914) – James Atteridge
 The Place, the Time and the Man (1914)
 Every Inch A King (1914) – King Livian
 The Loose Change of Chance (1914)
 The Way of the Woman (1914)
 The Shanty at Trembling Hill (1914)
 The Gallantry of Jimmy Rodgers (1915) – Ralph Morrison
 The Lieutenant Governor (1915) – Dennis McGrath
 The Ambition of the Baron (1915)
 Thirteen Down (1915) – Baron Schoman
 The Accounting (1915) – Sargall
 The Amateur Prodigal (1915)
 The Surprise of My Life (1915)
 The Strength of the Weak (1915)
 The Other Woman's Picture (1915)
 A Night In Kentucky (1915)
 Graustark (1915) – Prince Gabriel
 The Mystery of the Silent Death (1915)
 The Conspiracy at the Chateau (1915)
 On the Dawn Road (1915) – Granger
 The Slim Princess (1915) – The Only Koldo
 The Second in Command (1915) – Lt. Sir Walter Mannering
 The Silent Voice (1915) – Bobbie Delorme
 Pennington's Choice (1915) – Jean
 A Corner in Cotton (1916) – Willis Jackson
 The Come-Back (1916) – Mac Heberton
 The Masked Rider (1916) – Squid Archer
 The River of Romance (1916) – Reginald Williams
 A Virginia Romance (1916)
 Mister 44 (1916) – Eagle Eye
 Big Tremaine (1916) – Redmond Malvern
 Pidgin Island (1916) – Donald Smead
 The Promise (1917)  – Buck Moncrossen
The Hidden Children (1917) – Lt. Boyd
 The Haunted Pajamas (1917) – Judge Billings
 The Hidden Spring (1917) – Bill Wheeler
 Under Handicap (1917) – Brayley
 Paradise Garden (1917) – Jack Ballard
 Desert Love (1920) – The Whelp
 The Terror (1920) – 'Con' Norton
 Food For Scandal (1920) – Jack Horner
 Lone Hand Wilson (1920) – Lone Hand Wilson
 Are All Men Alike? (1920) – Raoul Uhlan
 The Ranger and the Law (1921) – Dick Dawson
 Blue Blazes (1922) – Jerry Connors
 The Masked Avenger (1922) – Austin Patterson
 Silver Spurs (1922) - Craig Hamilton
 Trapped in the Air (1922)
 In the Days of Buffalo Bill (1922)
 Blazing Arrows (1922) – Sky Fire
 The Devil's Ghost (1922)
 The Vengeance of Pierre (1923)
 The Zero Hour (1923)
 The Eagle's Feather (1923) – Jeff Carey
 Fighting Jim Grant (1923) – Jim Grant
 Western Grit (1924) – Walt Powers
 Ridin' Fool (1924)
 The Lone Hand Texan (1924)
 Hearts of the West (1925)
 Two Fisted Thompson (1925)
 Western Promise (1925)
 Range Vultures (1925)

References

External links

1888 births
1925 deaths
American male film actors
American male stage actors
American male silent film actors
Male Western (genre) film actors
United States Army personnel of World War I
Male actors from Chicago
Suicides by firearm in California
20th-century American male actors
Burials at Forest Lawn Memorial Park (Glendale)
1925 suicides